Macy Chiasson (born July 27, 1991) is an American mixed martial artist (MMA). She was the Women's Featherweight winner of The Ultimate Fighter 28 and currently competes in the Bantamweight division in the Ultimate Fighting Championship (UFC). As of October 3, 2022, she is #8 in the UFC women's bantamweight rankings.

Background 
Chiasson started mixed martial arts at the age of 19, after being bed-ridden for three and one-half weeks recovering from a car accident to get back the fitness level she once was when she was a softball player in high school. After attending some Krav Maga classes at the martial arts gym, she was attracted to the physical aggressiveness and the tough mental side of the combat sport and started teaching Krav Maga after one year of training. Chiasson transitioned to mixed martial arts, training under Mushin MMA and Mid City MMA, as Krav Maga is not a competition combat sport. Not long after she started training mixed martial arts, she started competing professionally.

Mixed martial arts career

Early career 
Chiasson began her professional MMA career in 2017 and amassed a record of 2-0, fighting under Invicta Fighting Championships (Invicta) and Cage Warrior Championship.  In 2018 Chiasson competed for a UFC contract on The Ultimate Fighter 28 UFC TV mma competition series.

The Ultimate Fighter
In August 2017, it was announced that Chiasson was one of the fighters featured on The Ultimate Fighter 28 UFC TV series.

Chiasson was the second pick of the featherweight fighters by coach Kelvin Gastelum.
 In the quarter-finals, she faced Larissa Pacheco. She won the fight via a technical knockout in round one. In the semi-finals, Chiasson faced Leah Letson She once again finished the bout by way of knockout in round one. This win secured Chiasson a spot in the finals against Pannie Kianzad.

Ultimate Fighting Championship
Chiasson made her promotional debut on November 2, 2018 on The Ultimate Fighter 28 Finale. against Pannie Kianzad. She won the fight via a rear-naked choke submission in round two and winning the Ultimate Fighter women's featherweight tournament.

She made her Bantamweight debut on March 2, 2019 at UFC 235 against Gina Mazany. She won the fight via TKO in the first round.

On February 10, 2019, Chiasson replaced an injured Leah Letson and faced Sarah Moras on May 4, 2019 at UFC Fight Night: Iaquinta vs. Cowboy. Chiasson won the fight via technical knockout in the second round. This win earned her the Performance of the Night award.

Chiasson faced Lina Länsberg on September 28, 2019 at UFC on ESPN+ 18. She lost the fight via unanimous decision.

Chiasson was scheduled to face Nicco Montaño on February 15, 2020 at UFC Fight Night 167 However, Montaño was forced to pull from the event due to injury and she was replaced by Shanna Young. Chiasson won the fight by unanimous decision.

Chiasson was scheduled to face Sijara Eubanks on September 5, 2020 at UFC Fight Night 176.  However, Chiasson pulled out of the fight for undisclosed medical reasons and was replaced by Karol Rosa.

The bout between Chiasson and Marion Reneau was originally scheduled for UFC Fight Night: Overeem vs. Volkov. However, during the week leading up to the fight, Reneau was pulled from the card after testing positive for COVID-19. The bout was rescheduled for UFC Fight Night: Rozenstruik vs. Gane. However, yet again, the bout was cancelled due to Reneau tested positived for COVID-19 and the bout eventually took place on March 20, 2021 at UFC on ESPN 21. Chiasson won the fight via unanimous decision.

Chiasson was scheduled to face Aspen Ladd on July 24, 2021 at UFC on ESPN: Sandhagen vs. Dillashaw. However, the bout was scrapped due to Chiasson suffering an injury. The bout was rescheduled to UFC Fight Night 193 on October 2, 2021. At the weigh-ins, Ladd weighed in at 137 pounds, one pound over the bantamweight non-title limit; due to health concerns resulting from Ladd's weight cut, the bout was cancelled.

Chiasson replaced Julia Avila to face Raquel Pennington on December 18, 2021 at UFC Fight Night 199. At the weigh-ins, Chiasson weighed in at 148.5 pounds, 3.5 pounds over the women's featherweight non-title fight limit. The bout proceeded at a catchweight with Chiasson fined a percentage of her purse, which went to Pennington. She lost the fight via guillotine submission in the second round.

Chiasson faced Norma Dumont on May 7, 2022 at UFC 274. At the weigh-ins, Dumont weighed in at 146.5 pounds, half a pound over the women's featherweight non-title fight limit. The bout proceeded at catchweight, with Dumont forfeiting 30% of her purse to Chiasson. Chiasson won the fight via split decision.

Returning to bantamweight, Chiasson faced Irene Aldana on September 10, 2022 at UFC 279. She lost the fight via knockout via an upkick to the body in the third round.

Championships and accomplishments

Mixed martial arts
Ultimate Fighting Championship 
Performance of the Night (One time) 
 The Ultimate Fighter: Heavy Hitters Women's Featherweight winner.

Mixed martial arts record

|-
|Loss
|align=center|8–3
|Irene Aldana
|KO (upkick to the body)
|UFC 279
|
|align=center|3
|align=center|2:21
|Las Vegas, Nevada, United States
|
|-
|Win
|align=center|8–2
|Norma Dumont
|Decision (split)
|UFC 274
|
|align=center|3
|align=center|5:00
|Phoenix, Arizona, United States
|
|-
|Loss
|align=center|7–2
|Raquel Pennington
|Submission (guillotine choke)
|UFC Fight Night: Lewis vs. Daukaus
|
|align=center|2
|align=center|3:07
|Las Vegas, Nevada, United States
|
|-
|Win
|align=center|7–1
|Marion Reneau
|Decision (unanimous)
|UFC on ESPN: Brunson vs. Holland
|
|align=center|3
|align=center|5:00
|Las Vegas, Nevada, United States
|
|-
|Win
|align=center|6–1
|Shanna Young
|Decision (unanimous)
|UFC Fight Night: Anderson vs. Błachowicz 2 
|
|align=center|3
|align=center|5:00
|Rio Rancho, New Mexico, United States
|
|-
|Loss
|align=center| 5–1
|Lina Länsberg
|Decision (unanimous)
|UFC Fight Night: Hermansson vs. Cannonier 
|
|align=center|3
|align=center|5:00
|Copenhagen, Denmark
|
|-
|Win
|align=center| 5–0
|Sarah Moras
|TKO (punches)
|UFC Fight Night: Iaquinta vs. Cowboy
|
|align=center| 2
|align=center| 2:22
|Ottawa, Ontario, Canada
| 
|-
|Win
|align=center| 4–0
|Gina Mazany
|TKO (punches)
|UFC 235
|
|align=center| 1
|align=center| 1:49
|Las Vegas, Nevada, United States
|
|-
|Win
|align=center| 3–0
|Pannie Kianzad
|Submission (rear-naked choke)
|The Ultimate Fighter: Heavy Hitters Finale 
|
|align=center| 2
|align=center| 2:11
|Las Vegas, Nevada, United States
| 
|-
|Win
|align=center| 2–0
|Allison Schmidt
|Decision (unanimous)
|Invicta FC 29: Kaufman vs. Lehner
|
|align=center| 3
|align=center| 5:00
|Kansas City, Missouri, United States
|
|-
|Win
|align=center| 1–0
|Miranda Dearing
|Submission (armbar)
|Caged Warrior Championship 16
|
|align=center| 3
|align=center| 1:38
|Houma, Louisiana, United States
|
|-

Mixed martial arts exhibition record

|-
|Win
|align=center|2–0
|Leah Letson
|KO (knees to the body)
| rowspan=2| The Ultimate Fighter: Heavy Hitters
| (airdate)
|align=center|1
|align=center|3:04
| rowspan=2|Las Vegas, Nevada, United States
|
|-
|Win
|align=center|1–0
|Larissa Pacheco
|TKO (punches) 
| (airdate)
|align=center|1
| align=center|3:48
|

See also
List of current UFC fighters
List of female mixed martial artists

References

External links
 
 

Living people
1991 births
Bantamweight mixed martial artists
Featherweight mixed martial artists
Mixed martial artists utilizing Krav Maga
Mixed martial artists utilizing Brazilian jiu-jitsu
American practitioners of Brazilian jiu-jitsu
American female mixed martial artists
Mixed martial artists from Louisiana
LGBT mixed martial artists
LGBT Brazilian jiu-jitsu practitioners
Sportspeople from New Orleans
Ultimate Fighting Championship female fighters
21st-century American women